Wheel Mountain is a  mountain summit located west of the crest of the Sierra Nevada mountain range, in Fresno County of central California, United States. This mountain is situated on the Black Divide in northern Kings Canyon National Park, one mile northwest of Devils Crags, and two miles south-southeast of Mount McDuffie, which is the nearest higher neighbor. Wheel Mountain ranks as the 216th-highest summit in California, and the fifth-highest on Black Divide. An approach to this remote peak is made possible via the John Muir Trail.

History
The first ascent of the summit was made July 26, 1933, by Lewis Clark, Marjory Bridge, John Poindexter, and John Cahill. This group also bestowed its name based on "the peculiar structure of the summit, which consists of four steep buttresses radiating symmetrically from the hub like the spokes of a wheel." This mountain's name has been officially adopted by the United States Board on Geographic Names.

Climate
Wheel Mountain is located in an alpine climate zone. Most weather fronts originate in the Pacific Ocean, and travel east toward the Sierra Nevada mountains. As fronts approach, they are forced upward by the peaks, causing them to drop their moisture in the form of rain or snowfall onto the range (orographic lift). Precipitation runoff from this mountain drains into tributaries of the Middle Fork Kings River.

See also

 List of mountain peaks of California

References

External links
 Weather forecast: Wheel Mountain

Mountains of Fresno County, California
Mountains of Kings Canyon National Park
North American 3000 m summits
Mountains of Northern California
Sierra Nevada (United States)